Lake Neuchâtel is a lake primarily in Romandy, in the French-speaking part of Switzerland. The lake lies mainly in the canton of Neuchâtel, but is also shared by the cantons of Vaud, Fribourg, and Bern. It comprises one of the lakes in the Three Lakes Region (French: Pays des Trois-Lacs, German: Drei-Seen-Land), along with lakes Biel/Bienne and Morat/Murten.

In comparison to the Lake Geneva region, the Lake Neuchatel shoreline has experienced significant economic development with the completion of the regional motorway network. It is also known to have housed a Celtic agglomeration on pile-dwellings called La Tène and which gives its name to the second Iron Age.

The lake is fed by the rivers L'Orbe (called La Thielle or La Thièle locally, downstream of the city of Orbe), L'Arnon, L'Areuse, Le Seyon, and La Menthue, as well as by the Canal de la Broye. The Thielle Canal drains the lake into Lake Biel and is part of regulation system for the lakes and the rivers of the Seeland region.

Lake Neuchâtel was the home of the now extinct species of deepwater trout Salvelinus neocomensis.

Geography 
Lake Neuchatel is situated at the foot of the Jura mountain range, on the Swiss Plateau. Mainly in the French-speaking Swiss Romande, it borders the territory of four cantons: Neuchâtel, Vaud, Fribourg and Bern.

The lake's main tributaries are the Thiele and the Broye canal which connect it to Lake Morat. It flows into Lake Biel via the Thielle canal (German: Zihlkanal). 

Since the Jura water correction in the 19th and 20th centuries, it has served, together with Lake Morat, as a compensation basin for the waters of the Aare flowing into Lake Biel. Indeed, if the level of the latter rises too much, the flow may stop or even go in the opposite direction.

It is the largest lake located entirely on Swiss territory, considering that Lake Geneva and Lake Constance are shared with neighboring countries.

In the summer of 2021, Lake Neuchatel reached historically high water levels due to widespread flooding over mainland Europe.

History and prehistory 
The lake was frequented by prehistoric man as evidenced by the remains (site of the Auvernier lake resort and archeological museum, the Laténium) where bones of brown bear and Eurasian beaver were also found (two species then almost ubiquitous in Europe).

When the first Swiss towns appear, Mont Vully, which was a large fortified area of around 50 hectares built around 120 BCE, controlled the lakes of Morat and Neuchâtel while the La Tène area remained nearly unoccupied. What is now Yverdon-les-Bains was located on a barrier island on the other side of the lake, a place of smaller settlement (3 to 4 hectares) occupied from the 4th century BCE, and later fortified in 80 BCE by means of a long and solid rampart with frontal posts (like that of Vully), before this oppidum (Eburodunum) becomes a vicus in the first centuries CE.

The first written mention of the lake dates from the year 998 CE, where a laci everdunensis (or lake of Yverdon, from its Latin name Eburodunum) is mentioned, near which the priory of Bevaix was founded. The name dominates throughout the Middle Ages, co-utilized with the current term Lake Neuchâtel, however, is frequent from the 15th century onwards. The latter became dominant during the 19th century, in particular with the lowering of the level of the lake and the development of the Vaudois railway, which reduced the importance of the Port of Yverdon.

Lake Neuchâtel, and in particular the town of Neuchâtel became a popular tourist destination during the Belle Époque period due to its climate and panoramic views of the Alps.

List of settlements on the lake

Northwestern shore

From Yverdon to La Tène (Southwest to Northeast):

Yverdon-les-Bains (VD)
Grandson (VD)
Bonvillars (VD)
Onnens (VD)
Corcelles-près-Concise (VD)
Concise (VD)
Vaumarcus (NE)
Sauges (Saint-Aubin-Sauges) (NE)
Saint-Aubin (Saint-Aubin-Sauges) (NE)
Gorgier, Chez-Le-Bart (Gorgier) (NE)
Bevaix (NE)
Cortaillod (NE)
Areuse (Boudry) (NE)
Colombier (Milvignes) (NE)
Auvernier (Milvignes) (NE)
Serrières (Neuchâtel)
Neuchâtel
Hauterive (NE)
St-Blaise (NE)
Marin-Epagnier (La Tène) (NE)

Southeastern shore
From Yverdon to Gampelen:

Cheseaux (Cheseaux-Noréaz) (VD)
Yvonand (VD)
Cheyres (Cheyres-Châbles) (FR)
Châbles (Cheyres-Châbles) (FR)
Font (Estavayer) (FR)
Estavayer-le-Lac (Estavayer) (FR)
Forel (Estavayer) (FR)
Chevroux (VD)
Pré de Riva (Gletterens) (FR)
Portalban (Delley-Portalban) (FR)
Chabrey (Vully-les-Lacs) (VD)
Champmartin (Cudrefin) (VD)
Cudrefin (VD)
La Sauge (Cudrefin) (VD)
Lindehof, Witzwil (Ins) (BE)
Tannenhof (Gampelen) (BE)

Notes

External links

Waterlevels at the Harbour of Neuchâtel from the Swiss Federal Office for the Environment

 
L Lake Neuchatel
Neuchatel
Neuchatel
Neuchatel
Neuchatel
Neuchatel
Bern–Fribourg border
Fribourg–Vaud border
Bern–Vaud border
Bern–Neuchâtel border
Ramsar sites in Switzerland